Colin Edward "Col" Westaway (27 August 1936 – 15 October 2015) was an Australian cricketer. He played nineteen first-class matches for Queensland between 1957 and 1964.

References

External links
 

1936 births
2015 deaths
Australian cricketers
Queensland cricketers
Cricketers from Brisbane